The Castillo del Príncipe (Castle of the Prince) is a military fort located in the Loma de Aróstegui, in Havana, Cuba. In 1982, the fort was inscribed on the UNESCO World Heritage List, along with other historic sites in Old Havana, because of the city's importance in the European conquest of the New World, its fortifications, and its unique architecture.

History 
The fort was built during the wave of military constructions in Cuba, after the end of the Capture of Havana, by the English that lasted almost a year, the Spanish government realized that the city was unprotected and transformed the "Key of the New World", in the most fortified city of the American continent.

The castle owes its name to Charles of Bourbon, Prince of Asturias, son and future successor of King Charles III of Spain. The construction was in charge of the colonel of engineers Silvestre Abarca, the same one who built the Fortress of San Carlos de La Cabaña in the bay.

The works began in 1767 and concluded in 1779, although since 1771, the place had already been fortified, while the rest of the works of the military complex were finished.

The fortification had different uses, among them that of prison, a function it performed from colonial times until the triumph of the Cuban Revolution, the castle became the most important in Havana. The fort continues to be a prison until the 1970s of the 20th century. Then the government transforms it into a unit of military ceremonies

It housed common and political prisoners, including José Martí's teacher, Rafael María de Mendive. Julio Antonio Mella, Eduardo Chibás, Raúl Roa, Juan Marinello and many other prominent revolutionaries were also imprisoned.

Structure
The castle has the shape of an irregular pentagon and has two bastions, two semi-bastions and a redan (V-shaped protrusion), further comprises deep trenches, mine galleries, warehouses, offices, a water cistern and a housing area large enough to accommodate a garrison of 1000 soldiers. Its defensive artillery had 60 cannons of various calibers. It also has a system of tunnels built with red bricks that allow communication with all the outposts and most remote positions of the castle.

The position of Castillo del Príncipe allowed a broad view of the city, to the remains of the old city wall, from Campus Martius.

The fort overlooked Avenue Carlos III (today officially called Avenue Salvador Allende), which led to the house of rest and recreation of the Captains General, called Quinta de los Molinos.

Prison
The fortification had various uses including as a prison that served from colonial times until the triumph of the Cuban Revolution. After the arrival of the revolutionary forces, the fort became the home of a unit of military ceremonies.
The fort was primarily used by Castro's revolutionary armed forces to hold common and political prisoners. During 1961-1962 it housed surviving members of the Bay of Pigs Invasion who were ransomed on Christmas Day 1962.

Detainees
The fortress housed detainees and prisoners including the teacher of José Martí, Rafael María de Mendive, Julio Antonio Mella, Eduardo Chibás, Raúl Roa García, Juan Marinello, and El Caballero de Paris.

Gallery

See also

 List of buildings in Havana
 Quinta de los molinos
 Campo de Marte, Havana
 Plaza del Vapor, Havana
 Palacio de Aldama
 Barrio de San Lázaro, Havana

References

Bibliography
The Bay of Pigs: The Leaders' Story of Brigade 2506 (9780393331202): Johnson, Haynes: Books

External links

 CASTILLO DEL PRÍNCIPE PROMO MEMORIA DE LA HABANA 38

Fortifications of Havana
Spanish colonial fortifications in Cuba
Buildings and structures completed in 1779